A Woman of No Importance is a 1936 German drama film directed by Hans Steinhoff and starring Gustaf Gründgens, Käthe Dorsch and Friedrich Kayßler. It is based on Oscar Wilde's play A Woman of No Importance.

It was shot at the Johannisthal Studios in Berlin. The film's art direction was by Otto Erdmann and Hans Sohnle.

Cast

References

Bibliography
 Klaus, Ulrich J. Deutsche Tonfilme: Jahrgang 1936. Klaus-Archiv, 1988.

External links

1936 comedy-drama films
Films of Nazi Germany
German comedy-drama films
Films directed by Hans Steinhoff
Films set in England
Tobis Film films
Films based on works by Oscar Wilde
German films based on plays
German multilingual films
Films shot at Johannisthal Studios
German black-and-white films
1936 multilingual films
1930s German films